Wilbert Hurst-Brown (24 August 1899 – 4 April 1964) was a British physician and ice hockey player who competed in the 1928 Winter Olympics.

In 1928 he finished fourth with the British team in the Olympic tournament.

External links
 
Wilbert Brown's profile at the British Olympic Association
Wilbert Brown's profile at Sports Reference.com

1899 births
1964 deaths
Ice hockey players at the 1928 Winter Olympics
Olympic ice hockey players of Great Britain